Mahavishnu (Sanskrit: महाविष्णु)  is an aspect of Vishnu, the principal deity in Vaishnavism. In his capacity as Mahavishnu, the deity is known as the Supreme Purusha, the absolute protector and sustainer of the universe, the one who is beyond human comprehension, and all attributes.

Literature 
The Bhagavata Purana, among the most revered texts among Vaishnavas, attributes the following qualities to Mahavishnu:

The Srimad Bhagavatam also states that Krishna is the Supreme Being, who expands first as Balarama, then into the first quadruple expansion of Sankarshana, Vasudeva, Pradyumna, and Aniruddha. Sankarshana expands into Narayana, then Narayana expands into the second quadruple expansion of Sankarshana, Vasudeva, Pradyumna, and Aniruddha, then Sankarshana expands into Karanodakasayi-Visnu (Maha-Vishnu), who reclines within the Mahat-Tattva, the first expansion Purusha is used interchangeably for Mahavishnu. From sattva emerges Vishnu (Garbhodakshayi), and from tamas arises Shankara. These are known as the guna avatars of Krishna.

Role 
Mahavishnu is said to lie in the Causal Ocean, or the Karana Sagar. According to Vaishnava cosmogony, he puts the seed of this material universe in Mahamaya by glancing at her. Mahamaya remains the ever obedient material energy of Vishnu. All the natural elements including sky, fire, water, air and land are created along with mind, intelligence and false ego.

After this, Mahavishnu enters each of the many universes so created (seeds emerging from the pores of His skin) as Garbhodaksayi Vishnu, who lays down in each and every of these individual material universes (Brahmanas). It can be interpreted that Garbodakshayi Vishnu is the collective soul of all souls in a particular material universe, and that Mahavishnu is the collective soul of all souls in all of the material universes.

From Garbhodaksayi Vishnu then emerges Brahmā, who is the secondary creator (due to his need to meditate to create planets in the material universe) of the planetary systems within this material universe (Brahmanda).

Gaudiya Vaishnavism 
In Gauḍīya Vaishnavism, a school of Vaiṣhṇavism, the Satvata-tantra describes three different forms, or aspects, of Mahavishnu: Karanarnavasayi Viṣhṇu, Garbhodakaśāyī Viṣhṇu and Kṣīrodakaśāyī Vishnu. .Brahman (impersonal invisible aspect) then as Paramatma (Aspect beyond the understanding of human soul), and finally as Sarvatma (incarnating for bringing perfection). Bhakti (loving devotion) is offered to Sarvatman (Krishna or Rama avatars or incarnations of Vishnu, Narayana bringing both peace and perfection of the living beings). In this way, bhakti surpasses even yoga, which is aimed at the Supersoul, Paramatman. Karanodaksayi Vishnu is understood to be Sankarsana (form) of the Chatur-vyuha of Narayaņa. It is also often used interchangeably with Vishnu to indicate reverence, as the prefix "Maha" in Vishnu indicates the greatness and the vastness of Narayana. All the deities that bear material form like Shiva and Brahma are considered as a grain of sand in the ocean of Mahavishnu's vishvarupam.

See also
Garbhodakaśāyī Vishnu
Kṣīrodakaśāyī Vishnu
Narayana
Paramatman

References

External links 
 Thousand names of the Supreme (Vishnu Sahasranama Stotram)
 A detailed article by Stephen Knapp

Forms of Vishnu
Vedanta